Koyanovo is a rural locality (a selo) in Lobanovskoye Rural Settlement, Permsky District, Perm Krai, Russia. The population was 1,320 as of 2010. There are 19 streets.

Geography 
Koyanovo is located 28 km south of Perm (the district's administrative centre) by road. Mulyanka is the nearest rural locality.

References 

Rural localities in Permsky District